Mannu (English: The Soil) is a 1978 Malayalam film.

Mannu may also refer to:

Mánnu (English: The Moon), a 1999 album by the Finnish folk music group Angelit
Vilda Mánnu, the second album by Finnish band Eternal Tears of Sorrow
Mannu Bhandari (born 1931), Indian author, wrote Hindi novels, Aapka Banti and Mahabhoj
Capo Mannu, promontory in Sardinia, Italy
Flumini Mannu, river in southern Sardinia, Italy

See also
Manu (disambiguation)